Folksblat ('People's Newspaper') was a Yiddish language daily published in Uruguay 1931–1964. It had a Zionist orientation.

The newspaper was founded as Der tog ('The Day'). It was the first Jewish daily newspaper in the country. Its offices were located at 1911 Andes in downtown Montevideo. Berl Reznicovich and Moisés Orzuj were the editors of Der tog.

In 1933 it changed name to Der uruguayer tog ('The Uruguayan Day'). In 1935 it took the name Folksblat. As of the late 1950s, it was estimated to have a circulation of 8,000. It was published as a morning daily, except on Mondays. The newspaper was closed down in 1964.

References

Ashkenazi Jewish culture in Uruguay
Yiddish newspapers
Defunct newspapers published in Uruguay
Publications established in 1931
1931 establishments in Uruguay
1964 disestablishments in Uruguay
Jews and Judaism in Montevideo
Yiddish culture in South America